is a late night anime TV series created by Ayana Itsuki that is adapted from a PC-9801 game of the same name.

Nightwalker incorporates elements of the horror, detective story and vampire genres, and is critically noted as a vampire story "with a bit of a twist". The main character is Shido, a vampire who protects humans from other supernatural creatures. A private investigator by day and a demon hunter by night, Shido solves murder cases caused by monsters called Nightbreeds.

Video game
 is a 16-color PC-9801 eroge released by Tomboy in December 1993. Nightwalker is an adventure game, focused mostly on character interaction and problem solving. While the main characters of this game have the same names and similar appearances to their anime equivalents, their personalities are generally more easy-going and their backgrounds are less tragic (they all have living relatives). In comparison to the anime, the game is fairly lighthearted, with Shidō and Guni providing comic relief.

Nightwalker was initially developed as a spin-off project of the adult game Bishōjo Audition: Find an Idol released by Tomboy in February 1993, with the character Rihoko Ayukawa from that game reappearing as a heroine. However, in the process of refining the setting, the heroine's name was changed to Riho Yamazaki, her design was changed, and the story and setting were separated from the previous work. The concept of the world of Nightwalker itself is based on illustrations from 1992.

In 2001 the developer Arieroof remade this game for Windows 2000 as just Nightwalker. This version uses the same source drawings as the original game, except with 256-color displays, and plays similarly. The characters are recolored, and match the anime more closely. (Shidō's hair is purple, Guni's body is green. Inexplicably, Yayoi's hair is bubblegum pink.)

Anime

Development
One oddity of the series is that the character designs for the first four episodes are different from the main character designs used for the rest of the series and both the opening and ending.  This is due to the fact that these episodes were intended to be presented as an OVA, with the remaining episodes added after the fact to make up the entire series. In fact, Nightwalker is the first anime TV series (as opposed to OVA) adaptation of an adult game.

Story
As a group, nightbreeds (often referred to by the abbreviation 'breed') are usually self-serving and of low intelligence, and they drive a human host to commit crimes. Because these breed-inspired crimes are often difficult to identify, a special agency known as the N.O.S. has been organized to investigate and solve breed-related cases.

Shido, the main character of the series, is a vampire who decided to defend humans against his demonic brethren as atonement for the sins he committed early in his vampiric life. He knows little of his life prior to becoming a vampire, and even his name is a pseudonym he took when he arrived in Japan. Upon settling down in Japan, Shido established a one-man (plus one-secretary) private investigator office, which he uses as a means to hunt breeds while keeping his true nature secret. Shido even keeps his identity secret from Riho, a teenage high school girl he decided to employ as a secretary after her parents were killed in a breed attack.

All is not business as usual at Shido's office, however, as Shido is soon forced to reveal to Riho that he is the same sort of creature that killed her parents. Furthermore, Shido's powerful and obsessive sire, Cain, has plans in motion to reclaim Shido, as well as to initiate the 'Golden Dawn', a secret with far-reaching implications for all creatures of the night.

Characters
 
The main character, Tatsuhiko Shido is a private detective. He is also a vampire with the ability to manipulate his own blood to form weapons. It is also implied that he has the ability to create illusions. Shido has an outwardly mercurial personality, but beneath that, he is very serious and dedicated so much so that he is likely to blame himself when something goes wrong. He is often employed by Yayoi Matsunaga. He is a quarter-vampire (one of his grandfathers was a full-blood vampire, and the rest of his family line is of Japanese descent), Shidō has inherited guardianship of the passage between the mortal world and the demon world, but otherwise he lives as a human. His 'day job' is private investigator, and he works closely with the Kanagawa police. Through this connection, he learns that a girl he was unable to save from nightbreeds was a student at St. Michael Girls Academy, and goes to the school to investigate. He is quite pleased about this because he is something of a pervert, and takes plenty of time out to ogle the teenage girls.

 
An agent with the N.O.S. anti-nightbreed crime unit. Yayoi pays Shido with her blood in exchange for his expertise in investigating nightbreeds, and their relationship goes beyond being strictly professional. In the game, Yayoi comes from a  police family, and her father, the chief of the Yokohama police, worked closely with Shidō's vampiric relatives. As much as Yayoi resents it, she seems to be destined for the same role. She and Shidō dated prior to the game, but the relationship fell apart. Now they spend most of their time together bickering, and Shidō loves to tease her. Yet, there's still a bit of a spark between them.

 
An orphaned high-school aged girl whose family was murdered by nightbreeds. Riho idolizes Shido and works as his secretary, but is initially unaware of that he is a vampire. She learns Shido's secret while attempting to help him with an investigation, but decides to continue working for him despite this. In both the PC Game and anime series, she is a student at St. Michael Academy, she shared a dorm room with Miyako, a girl who as murdered by nightbreeds. Normally cheerful and energetic, Riho is shocked and depressed by her friend's murder. When Shidō comes to her for help, she vows to avenge her friend's death and helps Shidō unravel the conspiracy based out of the school. Shidō drinks Riho's blood in the finalé of the game, and she  becomes a vampire. Because of the death of her parents, she lives by herself in an apartment complex. Originally, Nightwalker was planned to have Rihoko Ayukawa, a character from a previous Tomboy game Bishōjo Audition, in the role of a heroine; as the project evolved, Rihoko became Riho. 

 
A small, fairy-like creature. Guni's relationship with Shido is like that of a familiar spirit, but she only assists him if she feels like it. She often irritates the others, especially Riho, with biting remarks.

 
Cain transformed Shido into a vampire long before the main events of the series. He and Shido once lived together in Transylvania; where they fed on countless innocent people. Over time Cain's cruelty drove Shido to leave him, though Cain refuses to let him go.

 
A childhood friend of Riho's from school. She along with Shunichi and Riho are members of their school's film club.

 
A male friend of Riho and Mikako. He along with Riho and Mikako are members of the film club at school.

Episodes
The anime television series was broadcast on TV Tokyo from July 9, 1998 to September 24, 1998, with each episode referred as nights. In 2001, Central Park Media licensed and release the anime series on DVD in North America, under the U.S. Manga Corps label. The English dub was produced at Bang Zoom! Entertainment. The series is currently distributed by Siren Visual in Australia and in 2013 by MVM Films in the United Kingdom. Discotek Media has re-licensed the series in North America and released it on August 29, 2017.

Music
The soundtrack for the Nightwalker anime, composed by Akifumi Tada, is noted for its jazz themes and prominent use of saxophones. Gessekai is unusual in that it was not a purpose-written tie-in song, but was selected from BUCK-TICK's existing body of work. An official soundtrack was released in Japan on October 14, 1998 by Universal Music Japan.

Home releases
In Japan, Nightwalker: The Midnight Detective aired on TV Tokyo  and was later released on VHS in 1998 on six VHS tapes with two episodes each. It was also released on DVD by Pioneer LDC in 2007. It was licensed by US Manga Corps/Central Park Media and released on VHS in 2001 and on DVD in 2003. In the United Kingdom it was released on DVD by anime company MVM, and in Australia and New Zealand by Siren Visual Entertainment.

Radio drama
Radio drama adaptation by Yosuke Kuroda was broadcast in 1995 on KBS Kyoto. In 1996, it was decided to release it as a drama CD, but it was never released on a major label and was later distributed in very small numbers by doujin circles.

Manga
Manga adaptation by United Soji was published in Monthly Dengeki Comic Gao! in the September 1998 supplement, December 1998, and February 1999 issues. It is based on the radio drama version, and differs from the game and anime in many ways, such as setting and Shido's appearance and personality. It was not compiled in a book.

See also
Vampire film
List of vampire television series

References

External links
 
 
 
 

1993 video games
1998 anime television series debuts
Anime television series based on video games
Anime International Company
Central Park Media
Discotek Media
Eroge
NEC PC-9801 games
Occult detective anime and manga
TV Tokyo original programming
Vampire detective shows
Vampires in animated television
Vampires in anime and manga
Vampires in video games
Video games developed in Japan
Windows games